The British Islands is a term within the law of the United Kingdom which refers collectively to the following four polities:
 the United Kingdom of Great Britain and Northern Ireland (formerly the United Kingdom of Great Britain and Ireland);
 the Bailiwick of Guernsey (including the jurisdictions of Alderney, Guernsey and Sark); and
 the Bailiwick of Jersey;
 the Isle of Man.

The Isle of Man and the Bailiwicks of Guernsey and Jersey are Crown Dependencies and are not a part of the United Kingdom. The Parliament of the United Kingdom on occasions introduces legislation that is extended to the islands, normally by the use of Orders in Council. For this reason it has been found useful to have a collective term for the combined territories. A statutory definition can be found in Schedule 1 of the Interpretation Act 1978.

The term The United Kingdom and the Islands is used in the Immigration Act 1971.

Statutory definition
Section 5 of the Interpretation Act 1978 provides that "in any Act, unless the contrary intention appears" the expression "British Islands" is to be construed according to Schedule 1 of that Act, which contains the following paragraph:

Subject to paragraph 4(2) of Schedule 2, that paragraph of Schedule 1 applies, so far as applicable, to Acts passed after the year 1889.

Paragraph 4(2) provides:

The Irish Free State was established on 6 December 1922 and the Interpretation Act 1978 came into force on 1 January 1979.

The Interpretation Act 1978 applies to itself and to any Act passed after the commencement of that Act and, to the extent specified in Part I of Schedule 2, to Acts passed before the commencement of that Act.

This definition of "British Islands" does not include the British Overseas Territories.

History
The expression "British Islands" was formerly defined by section 18(1) of the Interpretation Act 1889. This definition applied to the Interpretation Act 1889 itself, and to every Act passed after the commencement of that Act on 1 January 1890.

Section 19 of the Lloyd's Signal Stations Act 1888 contained a definition of "British Islands". The Lloyd's Signal Stations Act 1888 was repealed by the Lloyd's Act 1982.

Colonial statutes

Section 5(2) of the Interpretation Ordinance, 1891 of British Guiana contained a definition of "British Islands".

Section 2 of the Interpretation Ordinance (c 2) (1953) of British Honduras contained a definition of "British Islands".

Section 28(ii) of the Interpretation and Common Form Ordinance, 1903 of the Seychelles contained a definition of "British Islands".

Law
Section 13(3) of the Foreign and Colonial Parcel Post Warrant 1897 (SR &  O 1897/721) and section 6(2) of the Foreign and Colonial Post (Insured Boxes) Warrant 1908 (SR & O 1908/1313) refer to "the law of the British Islands".

Inland

Inland postal packets
Section 62(16) of the Inland Post Warrant 1936 (SR & O 1936/618) defined the expression "Inland" in terms of the British Islands.

Inland bills
The definition of "inland bill" in section 4(1) of the Bills of Exchange Act 1882 refers to the British Islands.

Defence
Section 26(1)(a) of the Freedom of Information Act 2000 states:

Fisheries
The exclusive fishery limits of the British Islands were defined by section 28 of the Sea Fisheries Act 1883. This definition was repealed by Schedule 2 to the Fishery Limits Act 1964.

The fishery limits of the British Islands were defined by section 1(1) of the Fishery Limits Act 1964. This provision was repealed by the Fishery Limits Act 1976.

Extradition
Piggott said the effect of section 37 of the Fugitive Offenders Act 1881 was to make of the British Islands one coherent whole for the purposes of that Act. That Act was repealed by Schedule 2 to the Fugitive Offenders Act 1967.

Passports
The expression "British Islands" has been included on the covers of passports of the Isle of Man, passports of Guernsey and passports of Jersey.

See also 
 British Isles naming dispute
 List of islands of the British Isles
 Terminology of the British Isles

Notes

References
Stroud's Judicial Dictionary.
Frederick Stroud. "British Islands". The Judicial Dictionary. First Edition. 1890. p 90:  . See also "Inland" at p 391.
John B Saunders (ed). "British Islands". Words and Phrases Legally Defined. Second Edition. Butterworths. 1969. Volume 1. Page 187. See also pages 8 and 278.
Words and Phrases Legally Defined. Fourth Edition. 2007. Volume 1. Pages 7, 84, 192 and 280.
Kenneth Roberts-Wray. Commonwealth and Colonial Law. Frederick A Praeger. 1966. Pages 31, 33 to 37, 40, 72, 363, 428, 533, 663 et seq.
Hilaire Barnett. Constitutional & Administrative Law. Fourth Edition. Cavendish Publishing Limited. 2002. Pages 64 to 66. Tenth Edition. Routledge. 2013. Pages 16 to 18. See also page 531.
A W Bradley and K D Ewing. Constitutional and Administrative Law. Fourteenth Edition. Pearson Education Limited. (Pearson Longman). 2007. Page 35.
Knapp (ed). "The British Islands". International Enclopedia of Comparative Law. Mouton. The Hague. Mohr. Tubingen. 1976. Volume 1. National Reports: U. Appendix. Page U-103 et seq.
Kenneth R Simmonds, "The British Islands and the Community:  I–Jersey" (1969) 6 Common Market Law Review 156
Kenneth R Simmonds, "The British Islands and the Community: II—The Isle of Man" (1970) 7 Common Market Law Review 454
Kenneth R Simmonds, "The British Islands and the Community: III Guernsey" (1971) 8 Common Market Law Review 475
Tony Wright (ed). The British Political Process: An Introduction. Routledge. London and New York. 2000. Page 19:   .
Paul Rylance. Writing and Drafting in Legal Practice. Oxford University Press. 2012. Paragraph 28.4.2 at page 243.
Burnand, Burnett Hall, Boland and Watts (eds). The Annual Practice 1949. (66th Annual Issue). Sweet & Maxwell. Stevens and Sons. Butterworth & Co. London. Volume 2. Page 3214.

External links 
 
 Interpretation Act, 1978 (unofficial text)

 
1889 establishments in the United Kingdom
1889 in British law
Terminology of the British Isles
Law of the United Kingdom